Sergei Vladimirovich Lemeshko (8 July 1972 – 9 December 2016) was a Russian professional footballer and manager.

Club career
He made his professional debut in the Soviet Second League in 1990 for FC Shakhtyor Leninsk-Kuznetsky. He played one game in the UEFA Cup Winners' Cup 1995–96 for FC Dynamo Moscow.

Personal life
He died in Kaliningrad in 2016 at the age of 44.

References

1972 births
People from Kemerovo Oblast
2016 deaths
Soviet footballers
Russian footballers
Russia under-21 international footballers
FC Dynamo Moscow players
FC Rostov players
FC Tekstilshchik Kamyshin players
FC Tyumen players
FC Tom Tomsk players
FC Baltika Kaliningrad players
FC Arsenal Tula players
Russian Premier League players
Association football midfielders
FC Novokuznetsk players
FC Chita players
FC Spartak Nizhny Novgorod players
Sportspeople from Kemerovo Oblast